Once a Thief and Other Themes is an album of film and television themes by Argentine composer, pianist and conductor Lalo Schifrin recorded in 1965 and released on the Verve label. The album features rerecorded versions of Schifrin's themes from the motion pictures Once a Thief and Joy House and a theme inspired by the television series The Man from U.N.C.L.E..

Track listing
All compositions by Lalo Schifrin except as noted
 "Blues a Go Go" - 2:49
 "Once a Thief" (Dorcas Cochran, Schifrin) - 2:02
 "Insinuations" - 3:35
 "The Right to Love" (Gene Lees, Schifrin) - 3:07
 "The Cat" - 2:35
 "The Man from T.H.R.U.S.H." - 2:57
 "Roulette Rhumba" - 2:10
 "The Joint" - 4:23
 "Once a Thief (Instrumental)" - 2:02
 "Return to Trieste" - 4:06
Recorded at Van Gelder Studio in Englewood Cliffs, New Jersey on May 21 (tracks 6, 8 & 9) and May 23 (tracks 1-5, 7 & 10), 1965

Personnel
Lalo Schifrin - piano, arranger, conductor
Freddie Hubbard, Ernie Royal, Snooky Young, Clark Terry - trumpet
Jimmy Cleveland, J. J. Johnson, Tony Studd, Bob Brookmeyer - trombone
Jim Buffington, Bob Northern, Willie Ruff - French horn
Phil Woods - alto saxophone, clarinet, flute
Jerome Richardson, James Moody - tenor saxophone, flute
Margaret Ross - harp
Kenny Burrell - guitar
Don Butterfield - tuba
Bob Cranshaw - bass
Grady Tate, Dave Bailey - drums
Unnamed string section

References

1965 albums
Verve Records albums
Lalo Schifrin albums
Albums produced by Creed Taylor
Albums conducted by Lalo Schifrin
Albums recorded at Van Gelder Studio